Neville Jonas Laski  (18 December 1890 – 24 March 1969) was an English judge and leader of Anglo-Jewry.

Family 
Laski came from a distinguished family. His father was Nathan Laski (1863-1941), a Lithuanian Jewish Manchester cotton merchant and a leader of British Jewry; his mother, Sarah Frankenstein, had married Nathan Laski in 1889. His younger brother was Harold Laski. He married Phina Emily, eldest daughter of Moses Gaster; he had four children, including Marghanita Laski.

Education 
 Manchester Grammar School
 Clifton College
 Corpus Christi College, Oxford, MA Beit Prize, 1912.

Career 
Laski was a barrister and was appointed a Kings Counsel (KC) in 1930 and a Bencher of the Inner Temple in 1938.  He was a Judge of Appeal of the Isle of Man, 1953–1956 and Recorder of Burnley, 1935–1956.  He was a Judge of the Crown Court and Recorder of Liverpool (1956–1963).

During the First World War he served with the 6th Lancashire Fusiliers in Gallipoli, Sinai and France, retiring with the rank of Captain.

He was a member of the General Council of the Bar, 1950–1956, Chairman of its Professional Conduct Committee, 1952–1956 and its Honorary Treasurer, 1955–1956.

Other positions held 
 Chairman, Manchester Victoria Memorial Jewish Hospital
 President, London Committee of Deputies of British Jews, 1933–1939
 Presiding elder of the Spanish and Portuguese Jews Congregation, 1961–1967
 Vice-president, Anglo-Jewish Association

See also
 Who Was Who
Sagar v Ridehalgh & Sons Ltd [1931] 1 Ch 310, a UK labour law case where Laski KC represented the employer.

Publications 
 "The Laws and Charities of the Spanish and Portuguese Jews' Congregation of London" (1663-1677)
 "Jewish Rights and Jewish Wrongs"

References

1890 births
1969 deaths
Alumni of Corpus Christi College, Oxford
British Army personnel of World War I
People educated at Clifton College
English King's Counsel
20th-century English judges
English Jews
Lancashire Fusiliers officers
People educated at Manchester Grammar School
20th-century King's Counsel
Presidents of the Board of Deputies of British Jews
Members of the Inner Temple
Lawyers from Manchester